Coronal may refer to:
 a nuptial crown
 anything relating to a corona
 Coronal plane, an anatomical term of location
 The coronal direction on a tooth
 Coronal consonant, a consonant that is articulated with the front part of the tongue
 Coronal stop, a type of stop consonant
 Coronal loop, a structure on the surface of the Sun